The Gure or Gurre (Somali: Gurre) is a Somali clan, a sub-clan of the major Dir clan family.

Distribution 
The Gurre live in Liben zone and Afder zone. They dominate the districts, Qarsadula, Gorobakaks and Guradamol, which are named after the Gurre clan, but also live in Elkare, Afder and West-Imi districts.

Clan tree 
Gurre has seven sub-clans, namely Libano, Waju, Dhanqe, Jaarso, Yaco, Ya'ambabo and Eejo.

The following listing is taken from the World Bank's Conflict in Somalia: Drivers and Dynamics from 2005 and the United Kingdom's Home Office publication, Somalia Assessment 2001.

 Dir
Issa
Gadabuursi
Biimaal "Bimal"
Surre
Isaaq
Quranyow of the Garre "Gorajno"
Gurgura "Gurgure"
 Garrire "Gerire"
 Bajimal "Bajumal"
Barsuug "Bursuk"
Gurre''Goorre''

Notable figures 
 Ahmed Shide 
Juneid Mohammed

References 

Somali clans
Somali clans in Ethiopia